Samuel Spencer Page (April 21, 1857 – October 10, 1916) was a Canadian politician. He served on the Legislative Assembly of the Northwest Territories for Cannington from 1891 to 1898.

Page was born in England, the son of A. Shaw Page and  Eliza Mary Civian Tunney. He attended Rossall School and immigrated to Canada in 1882. An Anglican, he married Frances Michall Pierce in November 1885. From 1906 to his death, Page served as a clerk in the Legislative Assembly of Saskatchewan. He resided in Regina.

He was elected in 1891 to the Legislative Assembly of the Northwest Territories, and was defeated in the next election, in 1898. Upon his retirement he served as a clerk for the assembly, from March 14, 1901 to August 31, 1905.

Electoral results

1891 election

1894 election

1898 election

References

1857 births
1916 deaths
Members of the Legislative Assembly of the Northwest Territories